The 1900 VMI Keydets football team represented the Virginia Military Institute (VMI) in their tenth season of organized football. The Keydets went 4–1–2 under their new head coach Sam Walker.

The team's All-Southern Tackle was George C. Marshall, who went on to serve as Army Chief of Staff during World War II, and Secretary of State and Secretary of Defense under President Truman.

Schedule

References

VMI
VMI Keydets football seasons
VMI Keydets football